3728 IRAS, provisional designation , is a stony asteroid from the middle region of the asteroid belt, approximately 20 kilometers in diameter. On 23 August 1983, it was discovered by and later named after IRAS, a spaceborne all-sky infrared survey satellite.

Classification and orbit 

The S-type asteroid is also classified as a CX-type by Pan-STARRS large-scale survey. It orbits the Sun in the central main-belt at a distance of 2.1–3.2 AU once every 4 years and 4 months (1,576 days). Its orbit has an eccentricity of 0.21 and an inclination of 23° with respect to the ecliptic. The first used precovery was taken at Palomar Observatory in 1950, extending the asteroid's observation arc by 33 years prior to its discovery.

Rotation period 

In August 2008, a photometric lightcurve analysis by U.S. astronomer Brian Warner at his Palmer Divide Observatory, Colorado, gave a well-defined rotation period of  hours with a brightness amplitude of 0.21 in magnitude.

Diameter estimates 

According to 12 observations by the discovering Infrared Astronomical Satellite, IRAS, the asteroid has an albedo of 0.12 and a diameter of 19.6 kilometers. The Collaborative Asteroid Lightcurve Link derives similar figures, as do the space-based surveys carried out by the Japanese Akari satellite, and NASA's Wide-field Infrared Survey Explorer. Two publications from the post-cryogenic NEOWISE mission find a larger diameter of 23.4 and 27.5 kilometers, respectively.

Naming 

This minor planet was named for the discovering Infrared Astronomical Satellite (IRAS), a collaboration between the United States (NASA), the Netherlands (NIVR), and the United Kingdom (SERC), which observed more than 250,000 celestial bodies in the infrared at wavelengths between 12 and 100 μm during 10 months in 1983. IRAS has also discovered two other minor planets, the 11-kilometer sized main-belt asteroid  and 3200 Phaethon, a near-Earth and potentially hazardous object, parent body of the Geminid meteor shower, as well as six comets, such as 126P/IRAS, a short-period Jupiter family comet, which was also named after the discovering space observatory. The approved naming citation was published by the Minor Planet Center on 4 May 1999.

References

External links 
  
 Lightcurve plot of 3728 IRAS, Palmer Divide Observatory, B. D. Warner (2008)
 Asteroid Lightcurve Database (LCDB), query form (info )
 Dictionary of Minor Planet Names, Google books
 Asteroids and comets rotation curves, CdR – Observatoire de Genève, Raoul Behrend
 Discovery Circumstances: Numbered Minor Planets (1)-(5000) – Minor Planet Center
 
 

003728
003728
Named minor planets
19830823